Oléna "Lena" Serhíyivna Ovchýnnikova (born April 22, 1987) is a Ukrainian kickboxer and mixed martial artist who competes in the featherweight division in kickboxing and the flyweight division in MMA. 

She is the reigning WBC Muaythai World Featherweight champion and the former world flyweight champion.

Career
Lena Ovchynnikova came to prominence as an amateur kickboxer and Muay Thai fighter, medaling at various national, European and world championships. She became a world champion in the professional ranks for the first time in 2009 when she won the ISKA Women's World Super Bantamweight (56.4 kg/124 lb) Oriental Championship and the following year, she added two more world titles to her mantelpiece by winning the World Kickboxing Federation (WKF) Women's World Super Bantamweight (-56.4 kg/124 lb) belt under both kickboxing and Muay Thai rules.

She challenged Christine Theiss for her WKA world title in Dresden, Germany on November 20, 2010, losing by sixth round knockout. Ovchynnikova was then set to fight Jeri Sitzes in a match for the WBC Muaythai Women's International Bantamweight (-53.5 kg/118 lb) title in Haikou, China on December 18, 2010 but Sitzes withdrew for undisclosed reasons and was replaced by Li Xiao in a non-title fight. She defeated Li by unanimous decision.

Taking the place of Cong Wang who pulled out of the fight, Ovchynnikova faced professional debutant Tiffany van Soest in Las Vegas, Nevada, United States on October 22, 2011, and lost by technical knockout after retiring in her corner with a broken hand at the end of round two. Following this fight, Ovchynnikova forced herself to use only her left hand during rehabilitation which later made her ambidextrous. The pair were scheduled to rematch on July 21, 2012, in Croatia, but it never came to fruition.

Having amassed a perfect 8-0 record in mixed martial arts, Ovchynnikova signed with the Indian-based Super Fight League in 2012. She tasted defeat for the first time as a mixed martial artist in her promotional debut as she submitted to a rear-naked choke from Sanja Sučević in round two at SFL 1 in Mumbai on March 11, 2012. She then lost to Joanne Calderwood by unanimous decision at SFL 3 in New Delhi on May 6, 2012 in her next outing. Returning to Muay Thai, Ovchynnikova was expected to fight Emily Bearden for the IKF women's world bantamweight (-55.4 kg/122 lb) title at WCK Muay Thai: Nakamoto vs. Kitchen in Pala, California, US on August 18, 2012. Her opponent was later changed to Kealani Vanderleest in a non-title affair, however, and Ovchynnikova defeated her by unanimous decision. She was then set to compete in the Shoot Boxing World Tournament Girls S-Cup 2012 in Tokyo, Japan on August 25, 2012 and face Ham Seo-Hee in the quarter-finals but was pulled from the card due to problems between shoot boxing and Ovchynnikova's team and was replaced by Lisa Ward. She represented the WCK Muay Thai promotion's team against a squad of Chinese fighters from Wu Lin Feng at WCK Muay Thai: Matter of Pride in Las Vegas on November 11, 2012. Initially, her opponent was Tang Jin but was changed to Xifeng Tang. She lost by UD.

In her return to SFL, Ovchynnikova beat Fathia Mostafa via submission due to a guillotine choke at SFL 16 in Mumbai on April 26, 2013. Back in the Muay Thai ring, she defeated Emily Bearden by UD to be crowned the International Karate Kickboxing Council (IKKC) Women's World Super Bantamweight Muay Thai Champion at WCK Muay Thai: Hot Summer Fights in Temecula, California, US.

On January 25, 2014, she lost a split decision to Xiong Jingnan at Kunlun Fight 1 in Pattaya, Thailand.

Bellator MMA

Lena Ovchynnikova signed with Bellator MMA in 2016, going 2-2 in her first four fights in the promotion. Notably, she was the first-ever female flyweight to appear on a main card for the promotion.

Ovchynnikova was expected to face Denise Kielholtz in the co-main event of Bellator 196 in Budapest, Hungary on April 6, 2018. However, the fight did not happen.

Ovchynnikova was expected to face Kyra Batara in a strawweight bout at Bellator 261 on June 25, 2021. However, the bout was cancelled the week of the event with one of Batara's corner testing positive for COVID-19.

Championships and awards

Kickboxing
Boxxtomoi
2015 Boxxtomoi Muaythai Women's Championship 
World Boxing Council Muaythai
2014 WBC Muaythai World Flyweight Championship 
2019 WBC Muaythai World Featherweight Championship
International Federation of Muaythai Amateur
2010 IFMA Ukrainian Championships Silver Medalist 
International Karate Kickboxing Council
IKKC Women's World Super Bantamweight Muay Thai Championship (One time)
International Sport Karate Association
2007 ISKA Amateur European Championships Oriental Gold Medalist 
2007 ISKA Amateur European Championships Muay Thai Gold Medalist 
2007 ISKA Amateur European Championships Full Contact Silver Medalist 
2008 ISKA European Cup Muay Thai Silver Medalist 
ISKA Women's World Super Bantamweight (56.4 kg/124 lb) Oriental Championship (One time)
World Kickboxing Association
WKA Amateur Women's World Championship (One time)
World Kickboxing Federation
WKF Women's World Super Bantamweight (-56.4 kg/124 lb) K-1 Championship (Two times)
WKF Women's World Super Bantamweight (-56.4 kg/124 lb) Muay Thai Championship (One time)
World Pan-Amateur Kickboxing Association
2011 WPKA Amateur World Championships Low Kick Gold Medalist

Mixed martial arts record

|-
|Loss
|align=center|12–6 (1)
|Kate Jackson
|TKO (doctor stoppage)
|Bellator 223
|
|align=center|1
|align=center|4:20
|London, England
|
|-
|Loss
|align=center|12–5 (1)
|Alejandra Lara
|Submission (rear-naked choke)
|Bellator 190
|
|align=center|3
|align=center|4:09
|Florence, Italy
|
|-
|Win
|align=center|12–4 (1)
|Helen Harper
|TKO (corner stoppage)
|Bellator 177
|
|align=center|2
|align=center|5:00
|Budapest, Hungary
|
|-
|Win
|align=center|11–4 (1)
|Karla Benitez
|Decision (unanimous)
|Bellator 164
|
|align=center|3
|align=center|5:00
|Tel Aviv, Israel
|
|-
|NC
|align=center|10–4 (1)
|Mara Romero Borella
|NC (overturned by WMMAF) 
|WMMAF 2016
| 
|align=center|3
|align=center|5:00
|Lviv, Ukraine
|
|-
|Loss
|align=center|10–4
|Rebecca Ruth
|Decision (unanimous)
|Bellator 150
|
|align=center|3
|align=center|5:00
|Mulvane, Kansas, United States
|
|-
|Win
|align=center|10–3
|Svetlana Gotsyk
|Submission (rear-naked choke)
|WMMAF: World MMA Championship, Day 3
|
|align=center|3
|align=center|3:40
|Lviv, Ukraine
|
|-
|Loss
|align=center|9–3
|Lily Kazak
|TKO (punch)
|Oplot Challenge 92
|
|align=center|2
|align=center|0:21
|Kharkov, Ukraine
|
|-
|Win
|align=center|9–2
|Fathia Mostafa
|Submission (guillotine choke)
|Super Fight League 16
|
|align=center|1
|align=center|3:36
|Mumbai, India
|
|-
|Loss
|align=center|8–2
|Joanne Calderwood
|Decision (unanimous)
|Super Fight League 3
|
|align=center|3
|align=center|5:00
|New Delhi, India
|
|-
|Loss
|align=center|8–1
|Sanja Sučević
|Submission (rear-naked choke)
|Super Fight League 1
|
|align=center|2
|align=center|2:28
|Mumbai, India
|
|-
|Win
|align=center|8–0
|Eugenia Kostina
|Submission (armbar)
|PAMAU: President's Cup
|
|align=center|1
|align=center|3:26
|Mariupol, Ukraine
|
|-
|Win
|align=center|7–0
|Lyudmyla Pylypchak
|Submission (armbar)
|Independence Cup 2011
|
|align=center|3
|align=center|1:01
|Lviv, Ukraine
|
|-
|Win
|align=center|6–0
|Anna Smirnova
|Submission (armbar)
|International Gala Festival
|
|align=center|1
|align=center|4:12
|Truskavets, Ukraine
|
|-
|Win
|align=center|5–0
|Alina Premilou
|Submission (armbar)
|Ultimate Cage Fighters Championship: 20,000 Dollar Tournament
|
|align=center|1
|align=center|4:01
|Vienna, Austria
|
|-
|Win
|align=center|4–0
|Olga Prybulska
|Submission (armbar)
|International Gala Festival 
|
|align=center|2
|align=center|2:20
|Gomel, Belarus
|
|-
|Win
|align=center|3–0
|Olga Prybulska
|Decision (unanimous)
|ISKA: Europe Cup 2008
|
|align=center|3
|align=center|5:00
|Kyiv, Ukraine
|
|-
|Win
|align=center|2–0
|Anna Zubritska
|Submission (armbar)
|ISKA: Union Cup 2007
|
|align=center|3
|align=center|4:50
|Kyiv, Ukraine
|
|-
|Win
|align=center|1–0
|Svetlana Svetlana
|Decision (unanimous)
|International Gala Festival
|
|align=center|3
|align=center|5:00
|Kyiv, Ukraine
|{{small}Flyweight debut.}}

Kickboxing record

Legend:

See also
 List of female kickboxers
 List of female mixed martial artists
 List of WBC Muaythai female world champions

References

External links
 Lena Ovchynnikova at Awakening Fighters
 

1987 births
Living people
Ukrainian female kickboxers
Featherweight kickboxers
Ukrainian female mixed martial artists
Flyweight mixed martial artists
Mixed martial artists utilizing Muay Thai
Ukrainian Muay Thai practitioners
Female Muay Thai practitioners
Sportspeople from Lviv
Sportspeople from Dnipro
Kunlun Fight kickboxers